Boston Pizza (BP), known as Boston's The Gourmet Pizza Restaurant and Sports Bar outside of Canada, is a Canadian multinational restaurant chain that owns and franchises locations in Canada, the United States and Mexico.

History

Boston Pizza began in Edmonton, Alberta, on August 12, 1964, when four Greek immigrants, Trifon, Gus, Perry, and Ninos Agioritis opened Boston Pizza and Spaghetti House. By 1970, Boston Pizza had 17 locations in Western Canada, 15 of which were franchised.

One of the first franchisees was Jim Treliving, a Royal Canadian Mounted Police officer who lived down the street from the original location and was a regular customer. In 1968, he noticed the growing popularity of Boston Pizza and purchased the rights to open a restaurant in Penticton, British Columbia. While in Penticton, he met George Melville, a chartered accountant. He acted as Treliving's business consultant for four years, and, in 1973, became Treliving's business partner. Over 10 years, they opened 16 restaurants in British Columbia.

In 1983, Treliving and Melville acquired the Boston Pizza chain from Ron Coyle, who had acquired the company from Agioritis in 1978. The two divested 15 of their restaurants to other franchisees, converted one restaurant to a corporate training restaurant and set about establishing systems and operating standards to standardize company operations. In the early 1980s, Boston Pizza expanded into Eastern Canada but by late 1985 most, if not all restaurants in Ontario were closed.  In 1986, Boston Pizza became the official pizza supplier for Expo 86 in Vancouver. This major success for the company led to expansion in Eastern Canada. In the next two years, it led to another 17 franchises.

By 1995, the chain had grown to 95 restaurants in Western Canada with sales in excess of $110 million (CAD). Over the many years, the restaurants had become a success, more sports bars had been established as an integral part of the business.

In 1997, Mark Pacinda was hired to bring the chain to more eastern areas of Canada. Once an Eastern Office was opened in Mississauga, another restaurant was opened in Ottawa in September 1998. The company later opened a regional office in Laval, Quebec, in April 2004. , there are 348 Boston Pizza restaurants in Canada, and over 40 Boston's restaurants in the U.S. and Mexico.

Boston's

Boston's is the U.S. and Mexican version of the Boston Pizza franchise. In 1998, a U.S. headquarters was set up in Dallas, Texas. The Boston Pizza name was changed to Boston's The Gourmet Pizza, Restaurant and Sports Bar that same year. Boston's had over 30 stores in the U.S. and four in Mexico.

Promotional branding
As part of an advertising campaign created by ZIP communication, during the first round of the 2011 Stanley Cup playoffs, when the Boston Bruins played the Montreal Canadiens, the company temporarily rebranded its Montreal locations as "Montreal Pizza". In the final round of the playoffs, when the Bruins played the Vancouver Canucks, the company temporarily rebranded its British Columbia locations as "Vancouver Pizza".

Trademark dispute
In 2002, Boston Pizza commenced a lawsuit against Boston Market in the Federal Court of Canada over the trademark use of the word "Boston" in Canada. In its defence, Boston Market alleged that Boston Pizza's trademarks were invalid because they described a style of pizza from a specific area. The dispute continued after Boston Market ceased operations in Canada in 2004. The parties settled the dispute in 2008 under an agreement that Boston Market would not use the words "Boston" or "Boston Market" in Canada for five years for restaurants or any food or drink products (other than pre-packaged food products, but not including pizza and lasagna). Boston Market also agreed that it would not challenge Boston Pizza's use in Canada of any trademark that uses the words "Boston" or "Boston Pizza" (with certain exceptions).

See also

 List of Canadian restaurant chains
 List of Canadian pizza chains
 Pizza in Canada
 Pizza cake, a Boston Pizza product which later went viral

References

External links

Boston's The Gourmet Pizza Restaurant & Sports Bar (US)
Boston's The Gourmet Pizza Restaurant & Sports Bar (Mexico)

1964 establishments in Alberta
Companies based in Richmond, British Columbia
Companies listed on the Toronto Stock Exchange
Pizza chains of Canada
Pizza chains of the United States
Pizza franchises
Regional restaurant chains in the United States
Restaurants established in 1964
Restaurants in Alberta
Restaurants in British Columbia